Feminist International Radio Endeavor (FIRE) (also known as Radio Internacional Feminista) is an international women's internet radio station based in Costa Rica. Scholars have said that by providing a channel for female voices and giving alternative accounts of war and conflict, that it has performed important feminist media work supporting peace and social justice.  It was founded in 1991 by an international group of women including journalist María Suárez Toro.

References

External links
Documentary: Fire - Feminist International Radio Endeavour. (1995) Produced by Feminist International Radio Endeavor; Radio for Peace International.  
Suárez, Toro M, Dalya F. Massachi, Debra Cedeño, and Nancy Meredith. Women's Voices on Fire: Feminist International Radio Endeavour. Austin, Tex: Anomaly Press, 2000. Print. 

Feminist mass media
Radio stations in Costa Rica
Internet radio stations
Women in radio